In complex analysis, an area of mathematics, Montel's theorem refers to one of two theorems about  families of holomorphic functions. These are named after French mathematician Paul Montel, and give conditions under which a family of holomorphic functions is normal.

Locally uniformly bounded families are normal
The first, and simpler, version of the theorem states that a family of holomorphic functions defined on an open subset of the complex numbers is normal if and only if it is locally uniformly bounded.

This theorem has the following formally stronger corollary. Suppose that
 is a family of
meromorphic functions on an open set . If  is such that
in the complex plane.

Functions omitting two values
The stronger version of Montel's Theorem (occasionally referred to as the Fundamental Normality Test) states that a family of holomorphic functions, all of which omit the same two values  is normal.

Necessity
The conditions in the above theorems are sufficient, but not necessary for normality. Indeed, 
the family  is normal, but does not omit any complex value.

Proofs
The first version of Montel's theorem is a direct consequence of Marty's Theorem (which
states that a family is normal if and only if the spherical derivatives are locally bounded)
and Cauchy's integral formula.

This theorem has also been called the Stieltjes–Osgood theorem, after Thomas Joannes Stieltjes and William Fogg Osgood.
 
The Corollary stated above is deduced as follows. Suppose that all the functions in  omit the same neighborhood of the point . By postcomposing with the map  we obtain a uniformly bounded family, which is normal by the first version of the theorem.

The second version of Montel's theorem can be deduced from the first by using the fact that there exists a holomorphic universal covering from the unit disk to the twice punctured plane . (Such a covering is given by the elliptic modular function).

This version of Montel's theorem can be also derived from Picard's theorem,
by using Zalcman's lemma.

Relationship to theorems for entire functions
A heuristic principle known as Bloch's Principle (made precise by Zalcman's lemma) states that properties that imply that an entire function is constant correspond to properties that ensure that a family of holomorphic functions is normal.

For example, the first version of Montel's theorem stated above is the analog of Liouville's theorem, while the second version corresponds to Picard's theorem.

See also
Montel space
Fundamental normality test

Notes

References

Compactness theorems
Theorems in complex analysis